John Edward Koniszewski (August 29, 1921 – December 30, 2003) was an American football offensive tackle in the National Football League for the Washington Redskins.  He played college football at George Washington University.

1921 births
2003 deaths
People from Dickson City, Pennsylvania
American football offensive tackles
George Washington Colonials football players
Washington Redskins players
Players of American football from Pennsylvania